The 2021 Dayton Flyers football team represented the University of Dayton in the 2021 NCAA Division I FCS football season as a member of the Pioneer Football League. They were led by 13th-year head coach Rick Chamberlin and played their home games at Welcome Stadium.

Previous season

The Flyers finished the 2019 season 8–3, 6–2 in PFL play to finish in a tie for second place.  Due to COVID-19, the Pioneer Football League suspended the fall 2020 football season.  Dayton opted out of the spring season along with and Marist College.

Preseason

Preseason coaches' poll
The Pioneer League released their preseason coaches' poll on July 27, 2021. The Flyers were picked to finish in fourth place.

Preseason All-PFL teams
The Flyers had five players selected to the preseason all–PFL teams.

Offense

First team
Jack cook – QB
Jake chisholm – RB

Defense

First team
Brandon easterling – DB
Honorable mention
Zach rumpke – LB

Special teams

Second team
Sam webster – PK

Schedule

 Dayton's game with Robert Morris was cancelled due to a COVID-19 outbreak at Robert Morris. The game was not rescheduled.

References

Dayton
Dayton Flyers football seasons
Dayton Flyers football